This is a list of hunting video games developed in conjunction with Cabela's for a variety of gaming platforms.

Big Game Hunter series

4x4 Off-Road series
 Cabela's 4x4 Off-Road Adventure (2001)
 Cabela's 4x4 Off-Road Adventure 2 (2001)
 Cabela's 4x4 Off-Road Adventure 3 (2003)

Ultimate Deer Hunt series
 Cabela's Ultimate Deer Hunt (2001)
 Cabela's Ultimate Deer Hunt 2 (2002)
 Cabela's Ultimate Deer Hunt: Open Season (2002)

Deer Hunt series
 Cabela's Deer Hunt: 2004 Season (2003)
 Cabela's Deer Hunt: 2005 Season (2004)

Dangerous Hunts series
 Cabela's Dangerous Hunts (2003)
 Cabela's Dangerous Hunts 2 (2005)
 Cabela's Dangerous Hunts: Ultimate Challenge (2006)
 Cabela's Dangerous Hunts 2009 (2008)
 Cabela's Dangerous Hunts 2011 (2010)
 Cabela's Dangerous Hunts 2013 (2012)

GrandSlam Hunting series
 Cabela's GrandSlam Hunting: North American 29 (2000)
 Cabela's GrandSlam Hunting: 2004 Trophies (2003)

Outdoor Adventures series
 Cabela's Outdoor Adventures (2005)
 Cabela's Outdoor Adventures (2009)

Others
 Cabela's Sportsman's Challenge (1998)
 Cabela's Outdoor Trivia Challenge (1999)
 Cabela's Alaskan Adventures (2006)
 Cabela's African Safari (2006)
 Cabela's Monster Bass (2007)
 Cabela’s Trophy Bucks (2007)
Cabela's Legendary Adventures (2008)
 Cabela's Monster Buck Hunter (2010)
 Cabela's North American Adventures (2010)
 Cabela's Adventure Camp (2011)
 Cabela's Survival: Shadows of Katmai (2011)
 Cabela’s Hunting Expeditions (2012)
 Cabela's African Adventures (2013)
 Cabela's: The Hunt - Championship Edition (2018)

See also
 Deer Hunter (series)

References

External links
Cabela's Games on Giant Bomb

Cabela
Cabela's (video game series)